The Breaking Point was a 1923 Broadway three-act drama written by Mary Roberts Rinehart, produced by Wagenhals and Collin Kemper and staged by Kemper.

The play ran for 68 performances from August 16, 1923 to October 1923 at the Klaw Theatre, and was based on Rinehart's 1922 novel of the same name.

Cast
 Reginald Barlow as Dr. Miller	
 Gail Kane as Beverly
 Robert Barrat as Bassett	
 Zeffie Tilbury as	Lucy	
 Maurice Darcy as Joe	
 John Doyle as	David	
 Stephen Maley as Bill	
 McKay Morris as Dick	
 John Morrissey as	sheriff	
 Lucille Sears as Clare	
 Marie Valray as Indian woman	
 Robert Vaughn as Curley and as Riley	
 Regina Wallace as	Elizabeth

References

External links 
 
Mary Roberts Rinehart Papers, 1831-1970, SC.1958.03, Special Collections Department, University of Pittsburgh
Play at Gutenberg Project

1923 plays
Broadway plays
Plays set in Wyoming
Works by Mary Roberts Rinehart
Plays based on novels